Black Spectre has two meanings in the Marvel Universe. The first Black Spectre is the name of a fictional organization which first appeared in Daredevil #108 (March 1974) and was created by writer Steve Gerber and penciller Bob Brown. It was a league of costumed female commandos, entranced by the Mandrill into doing his bidding, and led by Nekra. The second Black Spectre is a fictional supervillain who first appeared in Moon Knight #25 (Nov. 1982) and was created by writer Doug Moench and penciller Bill Sienkiewicz. The character is one of the greatest enemies of the vigilante Moon Knight.

Publication history
The Black Spectre organization first appeared in Daredevil #108 (March 1974) and was created by writer Steve Gerber and penciller Bob Brown. The organization subsequently appeared in the next issues of the series with Daredevil #109-112 (May–Aug. 1974) written again by Steve Gerber. The author used it also in The Defenders #109 (May 1974) and Marvel Two-In-One #3 (May 1974). In 2012, the organization appeared in Daredevil vol. 3 series with issues #6, #8-10, 10.1, and #13, in Avenging Spider-Man #6 and in The Punisher vol. 8 #9, #11. The Black Spectre is one of the five criminal organizations used in "The Omega Effect" crossover between these three comic book series. In an interview with IGN about this crossover, writer Mark Waid explained "As we've seen in Daredevil, Matt has basically conned five of the biggest crime communities in the Marvel Universe - Hydra, AIM, Black Spectre, the Secret Empire, and Hidden Team. He's conned them out of a unique, super-science hard drive that contains key information on all five organizations. It's the hot potato he has that makes him the most dangerous man on Earth.".

The second Black Spectre first appeared in the eponymous story from Moon Knight #25 (Nov. 1982) and was created by writer Doug Moench and penciller Bill Sienkiewicz.

Years later, writer Doug Moench developed his creation in the four part Moon Knight: The Resurrection War mini series (Feb.–April 1998), pencilled by Tommy Lee Edwards.

The character appeared in the 2006 Moon Knight series, in the arc entitled "God and Country", issues #15–19 (March–Aug. 2008), written by Mike Benson and pencilled by Mark Texeira.

Black Spectre has an entry in the Official Handbook of the Marvel Universe A to Z Update #2 (2010).

Fictional biography

Black Spectre (organization)

The Mandrill created Black Spectre by organizing his female followers, disguising themselves as men using bulky armor.  He plotted to use Black Spectre to confuse America through terrorism and racism, instilling chaos in the world and intending to rule it after anarchy ensues.  Agents of Black Spectre stole printing plates during a battle between Daredevil and Beetle, and then organized a riot over the counterfeited money they secretly made and distributed. During the riot, Nekra captured Black Widow and returned her to the Mandrill, while Beetle and Daredevil disrupted the Black Spectre agents and sent them fleeing.

Mandrill was able to learn Daredevil's identity when he enthralled the Black Widow with his powers, and he then confronted Daredevil as Matt Murdock before escaping. Nekra and Black Spectre, with the Silver Samurai, kidnapped Shanna the She-Devil who was able to resist the Mandrill's powers. Mandrill planned to dissect Shanna's brain to determine how she was able to resist him.  Silver Samurai and Black Spectre attacked the Empire State Building and jammed all of America's communication lines. Mandrill and Nekra captured Daredevil, planning to have him dissected as well. Mandrill entered the White House and sat in the President's chair when Daredevil attacked him. Mandrill and Daredevil battled on the roof until the zeppelin carrying Black Spectre exploded, allowing Mandrill the chance to escape.

Later Daredevil came into possession of the Omega Drive, a piece of hardware which contained secretive information on five criminal organizations A.I.M., HYDRA, the Secret Empire, the Black Spectre and Agence Byzantine. This sensitive information could take down all these organizations, so they formed a conglomeration named Megacrime and they tracked down the superhero. After Black Spectre had framed Black Cat in an attempt to get the Omega Drive back which failed, Felicia left a note for Matt before she left warning him of Black Spectre's plot. Daredevil was able to get Reed Richards help in leaking Black Spectre's information to the Daily Bugle leading to their takedown as a warning.

In one of his missions, the Punisher learned of the existence of the Omega Drive from Black Spectre operatives and decided to find Daredevil. Reed Richards, whose technology had been used to create the coveted drive, asked Spider-Man to contact Daredevil. Both Punisher and Spider-Man found Daredevil and the three men had to work together against the conglomeration Megacrime. Later when Daredevil was being hunted down by the other Megacrime operatives, a group of Black Spectre agents show up to everyone's surprise and steals the Omega Drive. It was later revealed that these agents were actually some of Daredevil's teammates from the New Avengers who performed this ruse as part of his plan to be able to get the other Megacrime organizations off his back.

Black Spectre (Carson Knowles)

The Black Spectre was Carson Knowles, a Vietnam War veteran whose father was a politician. Upon returning, he discovered that his wife left him and his son was killed. He couldn't get a job and decided to get revenge on the city since it turned its back on him when he needed it most. Inspired by Moon Knight, Knowles became the Black Spectre, a master criminal. He also decided to run for Mayor of New York City. Knowles was defeated by Moon Knight and sent to prison.

Later, Black Spectre joined together with Morpheus and Bushman, two other foes of Moon Knight. They intended to use the power of the statue of Egyptian God Seth to curse diplomats at a U.N. conference.

Carson Knowles appeared again some time later, recently released from prison. He falls back into his ways as the Black Spectre and attempts to, yet again, destroy Moon Knight and hurt the city. Knowles frames several murders on Moon Knight, putting him under scrutiny by S.H.I.E.L.D. Knowles then steals Stark nanotechnology and is about to launch an attack, but Moon Knight pushes him off a building to his death.

During the "Dark Reign" storyline, Quasimodo researched Black Spectre for Norman Osborn. Quasimodo suggested finding a way to resurrect Black Spectre in the event that H.A.M.M.E.R. goes after Moon Knight.

Ryan Trent
Knowles's costume and identity were subsequently appropriated by Ryan Trent, a disgruntled member of the NYPD whom Moon Knight defeats in the deranged officer's first and only outing as the new Black Spectre.

Since he was a kid Ryan Trent was constantly undermined, having his decisions throughout his life continuously questioned. Even after he joined the NYPD, he didn't feel he was good enough.
When Moon Knight returned to New York City as a consultant for Detective Flint, Flint's preference over the vigilante caused Trent to finally break, and slowly descend into madness as he became obsessed with Moon Knight. Ryan began training himself, as well as he investigated about Moon Knight by interrogating former allies of him disguised as a S.H.I.E.L.D. agent. Using Carson Knowles, the Black Spectre, as an inspiration, Ryan aims to replace Moon Knight, believing that if he replaced Moon Knight and revealed himself to Flint, he would get be respected and get a promotion. In order to become even more similar to Moon Knight, who worked alone and had no ties to anybody, Trent murdered his wife. Now armed with equipment and a costume, Trent donned the mantle of Black Spectre and began attacking people and peeling their faces while yelling for Moon Knight. With Moon Knight's car finally arriving at his location, Black Spectre activated three I.E.D. planted in cars nearby to explode Moon Knight's car. Only two of them went off, but this was enough to destroy the vehicle. Black Spectre got out of the building he was hiding, expecting to find Moon Knight's corpse among the ruins. However, Moon Knight arrived at the scene using his glider. Before the fight could get started, Trent proclaimed that he was going to kill Moon Knight so he could be loved. Then, the third I.E.D. went off and exploded next to Black Spectre and injured him. When Trent was asked who was he supposed to be, he presented himself as Black Spectre. Moon Knight ripped off his mask and explained to him and he didn't want to be loved, because all those close to him suffered and died, and that because he worked alone he had always won. He then left Black Spectre and departed.

Analysis on Black Spectre character
During his supervillain career, Black Spectre has always been an enemy of Moon Knight and is considered as one of the greatest enemies of the vigilante. In his first appearance, the character is depicted as the antithesis of Moon Knight. In her essay titled "Fight Scenes, Fight Scenes Everywhere … And Not a Stop to Think", Heidi MacDonald declared that the story "Black Spectre" is more than just a fist fight. She analyzed it and concluded "It is about the way that Moon Knight's fortunes descend while Black Spectre's rise, and the way that Moon Knight conquers his weakness while Black Spectre falls to them.".

In an interview with Comic Book Resources, Augie De Blieck Jr., the reviewer of the 2006 Moon Knight series, noted that "Moon Knight's rogues' gallery seems to play a decent supporting role in each issue". Writer Mike Benson explained that there were many adversaries that he would like to bring back but he kept the villains which he felt "could easily fit the tone of the book".

Dave Richards, reviewer for Comic Book Resources, analyzed the death of Black Spectre and explained that it was a turning point in Moon Knight's life. In its past adventures, the vigilante demonstrated that he had no guilty conscience about seriously harming criminals, but he did have a strong code against killing them. According to Richards, Mike Benson used this violent death to separate Moon Knight and Khonshu, the Egyptian God of Vengeance. Khonshu is a character which claims that Moon Knight is his Avatar, and must therefore do Khonshu's bidding. Mike Benson confirmed in an interview that these two characters "have had such a cantankerous relationship that they needed a little distance."

In his review of Moon Knight #19, Kevin Powers, reviewer for Comics Bulletin, also noted "The ending of this issue is extremely well done and effectively concludes the main Khonshu-involved storyline that began with Charlie Huston". He said that it is an interesting evolution that could lead to storylines for future issues where reactions from his supporting cast could be explored. Powers stated that the most important moment is Black Spectre's dialogue during their last fight. It helped understand the character's desires. According to the reviewer, Carson Knowles "wants the people to love him; he wants to be their leader like he should have been back in the day when he ran for mayor, before becoming a villain". Even if Black Spectre is more powerful than the vigilante, he's also a classic villain whose ego often serves as his downfall.

In other media
A version of Black Spectre appeared in the Moon Knight pinball table of the video game Marvel Pinball: Vengeance and Virtue developed by Zen Studios. The player controls the Moon Knight character into the world of his crime fighting on the streets of New York City. The table pits the player against four Moon Knight's traditional enemies: Morpheus, Midnight, Bushman and Black Spectre. It culminates in a battle with the god of evil and death Khonshu.

References

External links
 
 
 

Characters created by Bill Sienkiewicz
Characters created by Bob Brown
Characters created by Doug Moench
Characters created by Steve Gerber
Comics characters introduced in 1974
Comics characters introduced in 1982
Fictional Vietnam War veterans
Marvel Comics supervillains